Brothers James and William Fisk-Moore were photographers active in Kent from around 1911. They traded under the name of B&W Fisk-Moore Ltd, James having taken the name of Beaufort James Fisk-Moore.

Early life 
Beaufort and William's mother was Louisa Fisk, born in 1839 in St Albans, Hertfordshire. In 1862 she married John Moore in the same city.

The 1911 Census shows Beaufort J Fisk-Moore aged 34 and William Fisk-Moore aged 30 living as boarders in a house in Canterbury, Kent suggesting birth dates in 1877 and 1881 respectively. Both were born in Folkestone, Kent. It gives their occupation as photographers.

Business 
The business traded in Canterbury at 4 St. Georges Gate, 7 St. George's Place and 10c Burgate Street. After many years of trading the partnership was dissolved in 1942 by mutual consent.

Legacy 
Images attributed to B&W Fisk-Moore appear in the collections of major galleries. The National Portrait Gallery holds two vintage bromide prints one of Bishop Albert William Lee the other of Bishop Alfred Carey Wollaston Rose. The British Museum holds a postcard size image, possibly a gelatin silver print of Tanzanian women in a rural setting.

Beaufort and William's names appear in the Hewlett Johnson Papers held at the University of Kent.

Within the Conway Library Collection of photographs at the Courtauld Institute of Art there are images attributed to B&W Fisk-Moore. The collection includes glass and film negatives as well as prints covering different time periods of mainly architectural images. The collection  is currently in the process of being digitised as part of the wider Courtauld Connects project.

References 

19th-century photographers
20th-century photographers
British photographers